The Summit One Tower is an office skyscraper located in Mandaluyong, Philippines. Originally built as a condominium project called Paladium Summit but when the concrete shell was completed the project fell through until a local tycoon bought and converted it into an office tower. Summit One Tower was previously owned and managed by Facilities Incorporated.

It is now owned and managed by Summit One Tower Building and Allied Assets, a part of the ATN Group of Companies. The building is registered as an economic zone with the Philippine Economic Zone Authority (PEZA) and its IT locator tenants benefit from government tax incentives. Although there is no sufficient source to confirm is official height, Skyscraperpage's website has an official diagram suggesting its height to be around 200 meters, which is highly dubious.

It is also serves as a radio transmitter of the FM radio station 91.5 Win Radio owned by Mabuhay Broadcasting System.

References

See also 
 List of tallest buildings in the Philippines

Skyscraper office buildings in Metro Manila
Buildings and structures in Mandaluyong
Office buildings completed in 1998